This tournament was a new addition to the ITF Women's Circuit.

Han Xinyun and Zhang Kailin won the inaugural tournament, defeating Varatchaya Wongteanchai and Zhang Ling in the final, 6–4, 6–2.

Seeds

Draw

References 
 Draw

China International Challenger - Doubles